Julius  Pierpont "J. P." Patches was a clown and the main character on The J. P. Patches Show, an Emmy Award-winning local children's television show on Seattle station KIRO-TV, produced from 1958 to 1981. J.P. Patches was played by show creator and Seattle children's entertainer Chris Wedes (April 3, 1928 – July 22, 2012).  When the show ended in 1981, The J. P. Patches Show was one of the longest-running locally produced children's television programs in the United States.

The J. P. Patches Show
The J. P. Patches Show was on TV for 23 years. For the first thirteen years, it was on twice a day, mornings and afternoons, six days a week (including Saturdays, where it aired only in the morning)) from Monday, February 10, 1958, through Saturday, December 26, 1970. For the next eight years, the show only aired mornings, six days a week, Monday, December 28, 1970, through Saturday, December 30, 1978. For the final two years, the show ran exclusively on Saturday mornings, Saturday, January 6, 1979, through Saturday, September 19, 1981. There was one final week of episodes, mostly retrospectives and farewells, from Monday, September 21 through Friday, September 25, 1981. The J.P. Patches Show ended up broadcasting around 12,000 episodes.

The show premiered on February 10, 1958, on KIRO-TV. The show was immensely popular in the Puget Sound area and southwestern British Columbia; at the peak of its run, the program had a daily local viewership of over 100,000. It was enjoyed not only by children but also by parents, who appreciated J. P.'s frequent use of double entendre (G-rated) and sly subversiveness that mostly went over their kids' heads. Two generations of viewers grew up as "Patches Pals", sharing the joyful zany antics of J.P. with their kids. Patches Pals were reminded every show to follow the Patches Pals daily checklist:

Mind Mommy and Daddy
Wash hands, face, neck, and ears
Comb hair
Brush Teeth
Drink your milk
Eat all of your food
Say your prayers
Share your toys
Put toys away
Hang up clothes

The J. P. Patches Show competed with two other local children's shows, Captain Puget on KOMO-TV, and Wunda Wunda and King's Klubhouse, both on KING-TV. Captain Kangaroo, CBS's own long-running children's show, saw its first half-hour preempted by KIRO-TV in favor of J.P. Patches.

After 23 years, KIRO-TV cancelled the show because of declining ratings, and the final episode was broadcast on September 25, 1981. After the show ended, Wedes continued to portray J.P. at many public and private charity events for another thirty years despite suffering in later years from incurable (but in remission) blood cancer.
Wedes spent many hours visiting sick children at Seattle Children's Hospital in Laurelhurst, never asking to be paid. In 2011, due to declining health conditions, Wedes announced that he expected his final public appearance as J. P. to be on September 17, 2011, fifty-six years after first donning the face paint. On December 14, 2011, a prime time special was aired on KCTS-TV titled J. P. Patches: Last Night at the City Dump, which was meant to serve as a farewell to the character. On July 22, 2012, at 84 years old, Chris Wedes died after a long battle with multiple myeloma, a form of blood cancer.

Premise
The show was live, unrehearsed improv with rarely more than two live actors on screen (Wedes and Bob Newman) but with frequent contributions from the sound effects man and off-camera crew. J. P. was the "Mayor of the City Dump", where he lived in a shack, the inside of which was the appropriately rough but colorfully-furnished studio set. He welcomed frequent guests: Seattle boy scout and girl scout troops, various local and national celebrities (see below), and his cast of supporting characters: Sturdley the Bookworm (a puppet), Esmerelda (portrayed by a Raggedy Ann doll), Ketchikan the Animal Man (a sort of Jack Hanna character), Boris S. Wort (the "second meanest man in the world"), LeRoy Frump (a character obviously based on Art Carney's Ed Norton), Tikey Turkey (a rubber chicken), Grandpa Tick Tock (a grandfather clock with an elderly face where the pendulum would be), The Swami of Pastrami, Ggoorrsstt the Friendly Frpl (a one-eyed brown shag carpet), Miss Smith (a motorcycle riding delivery woman who told mostly awful jokes), Superclown (a JP like superhero), J. P.'s evil counterpart P. J. Scratches (per official site I.M. Rags), and J. P.'s girlfriend, Gertrude. The show's supporting cast, male and female, human or non-human, was played by the versatile actor Bob Newman.

Bob Newman
Bob Newman (born January 24, 1932, on Mercer Island, Washington) initially started at KIRO-TV as a film-editor and floor director in 1960, two years into J.P.'s run.  He started hanging around the set, just to watch the fun. One of J. P.'s bits was to call the city dump operator Gertrude on a big yellow banana phone, although Gertrude herself was never seen or heard. One day, as J. P. asked for a ham sandwich from Gertrude for a picnic, Newman yelled out, in a falsetto voice, "Okay Julius, I'll send it right down."  Wedes was as surprised as everyone else, and from that day forward Newman became Gertrude, with his falsetto voice, frumpy dress and a wig made from a dyed red mop. J. P. got his "ham" as Bob Newman was willing to do anything for a laugh and proved to be the perfect foil for Wedes' improvisational comedy. He provided over 17 characters for the show and remained a faithful friend to Chris Wedes up until his death in 2012. Newman died on December 13, 2020.

ICU2TV
J. P. announced the birthdays of selected Patches Pals by "viewing" them on his "ICU2TV" set (a cardboard prop that created the appearance that J. P. was looking at you from inside your television). He predicted where a gift might be hidden in the child's house with amazing accuracy (with the never-mentioned assistance of a postcard from a parent). The sound effect used was the same, distinctive ringtone of Lloyd Cramden's "presidential hotline" telephone in Our Man Flint.

Famous guests on TV show

 Steve Allen and Jayne Meadows
 Al Capp
 Jacques Cousteau
 Beverly Garland (of My Three Sons)
 The Harlem Globetrotters
 Jack LaLanne
 Clayton Moore
 Jesse Owens
 Slim Pickens
 Dixy Lee Ray
 Debbie Reynolds
 Merrilee Rush
 Colonel Harland Sanders
 Danny Thomas
 Tiny Tim
 Burt Ward

Origin
Broadcaster Daryl Laub created the J. P. Patches character in 1953 for WTCN-TV in Minneapolis. When he left WTCN in 1955 for KSTP-TV, Chris Wedes (pronounced WEE-dus) took over the character from that point on. Wedes appeared on several WTCN programs. Besides J.P., his most notable character was Joe the Cook, a sidekick to host Roger Awsumb as Case Jones on WTCN's Lunch with Casey. Wedes brought J. P. with him when he moved to Seattle in 1958 to become KIRO-TV's first floor director. In addition to the long-running TV show, J. P. Patches made frequent fundraising appearances for local charities. He was a common sight at Children's Hospital, visiting sick kids and promoting the work of the hospital.

Late for the Interurban statue 

On August 17, 2008, a bronze statue of J. P. and Gertrude was unveiled on North 34th Street, about 250 feet east of the intersection with Fremont Avenue North, in the Fremont section of Seattle. The unveiling date was to celebrate the 50th anniversary of the J. P. Patches show. The unveiling was attended by hundreds of Patches' Pals, including Washington Governor Christine Gregoire, Congressman Jim McDermott, King County Executive Ron Sims, and several members of the county and city councils; both Chris Wedes (J. P. Patches) and Bob Newman (Gertrude) were present. The event was emceed by Pat Cashman, and the keynote address was given by Wedes' 16-year-old granddaughter, Christina Frost.

Merchandise and Videos
 A J. P. Patches action figure is distributed by Seattle novelty dealer Archie McPhee, along with a bobblehead, lunchboxes, Christmas ornaments and assorted other collectibles.
 In 1992, four VHS video tapes were released of the J. P. Patches Show. Because the show was performed and broadcast live—in real time—very, very little footage of the show was ever made.  There is a Christmas show, there is a highlights reel, there is a 20th anniversary show put together in 1978, and there is J. P.'s final show in 1981. All of the above footage was incorporated into a 2-DVD set in 2005.
 The book J.P. Patches, Northwest Icon, by Bryan Johnston and Julius Pierpont Patches (Chris Wedes), was released in 2002 by Peanut Butter Publishing.
 Johnston has also written a novel about Boris S. Wort and his campaign to "meanify" Seattle, entitled The 2nd Meanest Man in the World (2017).  Seattleites "of a certain age" will find many icons and events of their childhood put into the perspective of Wort's nefarious plot.
 In addition to the book and action figure, DVDs and tee shirts have been available at the Channel 9 store.

Popular culture
J. P. was listed as one of Krusty the Clown's birthday buddies in the animated television show The Simpsons (episode "Radio Bart") along with Bart.  This was similar to JP's I.C.U.2-TV segment. Matt Groening, the creator, drew a lot of inspiration from his former home in the Pacific Northwest such as naming the streets. JP and fellow Pacific NW clown Rusty Nails are considered the inspiration for Krusty.

See also
Official website
Fremont Troll
List of local children's television series (United States)

Notes and references

Video
 B&W with color sequences, remaster of rescued original recordings c. 1960s - early 1970s.
 Remaster of rescued original recordings c. 1970s.

Bibliography
Link to RealAudio archive of interview on local morning program on KUOW-FM 94.6, Seattle.Host talks with local Seattle stars from the J.P. Patches Show, 54m 56s.RealAudio link: "http://128.208.34.90/ramgen/archive/weekday/wkdy010104-b.rm?start='00:01:59.000'&end='00:56:05.048'"
  Date per "Montlake Landfill Information SumMarchy, January 1999".
  
 
 2006 appearances, inclusive.
 Chris Wedes holds the copyright, Bryan Johnston is the author.
 
 
 
 
Stein referenced Jack Broom, "The J.P. Generation", Pacific Magazine, The Seattle Times, 4 April 1993, pp. 6-11,14-17;
Bill Cartmel, "Hi Ya, Patches Pals", Seattle Post-Intelligencer, 11 April 1971, pp. 6-7;
Erik Lacitis, "Patches Understands – and Survives", The Seattle Times, 23 February 1978, p. A15;
[no title], The East Side Journal, 31 May 1962, p. 3; Ibid. 14 May 1969, p. 19.

External links

jppatches.com, official web site
Guide to the Chris Wedes Collection on J.P. Patches at the Museum of History & Industry, Seattle
PersonRatings Profile
HistoryLink history of J.P. Patches
Ketchikan the Animal Man (Bob Newman) fan site
Interview with J.P. Patches on local Seattle podcast, The Dave and Steve Show
J.P. Patches Tribute  Documentary produced by Full Focus

American children's television presenters
1958 American television series debuts
1981 American television series endings
1950s American children's television series
1950s American comedy television series
1960s American children's comedy television series
1970s American children's comedy television series
1980s American children's comedy television series
Culture of Seattle
Television in Minnesota
American clowns
American television shows featuring puppetry
Television shows about clowns
Fictional characters from Seattle
Local children's television programming in the United States